Andreas Bomark (born 20 September 1975) is a former Swedish bandy goalkeeper.

Bomark was a youth product of Edsbyns IF. He reached his first national final with Hammarby IF in 2003, but lost 4–6 to Sandvikens AIK. The club ended as consecutive runners-up in 2003, losing 6–7 to Edsbyns IF in the final.

References

External links
  andreas bomark at bandysidan
  ik sirius

Swedish bandy players
Living people
1975 births
Edsbyns IF players
IK Sirius players
Hammarby IF Bandy players